Blizzard Peak is, at , the highest peak in the Marshall Mountains, Queen Alexandra Range, standing  northwest of Mount Marshall and  southeast of Blizzard Heights, from which they are separated by a broad snow col It was so named by the Northern Party of the New Zealand Geological Survey Antarctic Expedition (1961–62) because a blizzard prevented them from reaching it for several days.

Features 
Lindsay Peak, standing 4 nautical miles (7 km) west-northwest of Blizzard Peak

References

External links

Mountains of the Ross Dependency
Shackleton Coast